Anna Sergeyevna Sorokina (born 1981 in Kaluga) is a Russian stage, film, and television  actress.

Biography 
She studied at Kaluga school No. 5 (from 1988 to 1996) and vocational lyceum No. 13 (from 1996 to 1999).

Since childhood, she was a creative child. At the age of 17, she accidentally found herself among the episodes of Stanislav Govorukhin's film Voroshilov Sharpshooter, after which she finally decided to link her fate with the acting profession. She entered VGIK, but failed. In 2005 she graduated from the acting department of GITIS, after which she entered the troupe of the Kaluga Regional Drama Theatre. In 2011 she graduated from the Sergei Taneyev's Kaluga Oblast College of Music  (vocal department).

In 2019, as part of the theater troupe, she took part in the project Russian Theater Seasons in Cyprus with Dmitry Burkhankin's play Desperate Dreamers, where Sorokina's production and play were received very kindly. Also, the performance was presented in the framework of the prestigious VII Festival The Oldest Theaters of Russia.

Personal life
There is a daughter, Polina (born 2011).

Theatrical works

Kaluga Regional Drama Theatre 
 Aksyusha —  The Forest  (graduation performance)
 Nyura —   Irkutsk Story  (graduation performance)
 Vera Sergunova —  Tomorrow was the War
 Prostitute —   Threepenny Opera   
 60s Girl —  Twelfth Night
 Rabbit —  Winnie-the-Pooh and all, all, all
 Cat —   The Bremen Town Musicians
 Totoshka —  The Wizard of the Emerald City
 Lily —  Alice in Wonderland
 Mona —   The Nameless Star 
 Tangeros —    Waiting for Tango  (film-performance)
 Girl —   Twelfth Night, or Whatever 
 Niece —  Don Quixote
 Elsa's friend —   Dragon 
 Elizaveta Ivanovna, Ekaterina Ivanovna's  sister   —   Ekaterina Ivanovna 
 Valka Lebedina —  Green Zone 
 Stranger —  If You Love, Find 
 Larissa   —  The Bride's Room 
 Armanda Bejart —  Royal Comedian with Bronze Bows on Shoes 
 Squirrel —  Dunno and his friends 
 Marya Konstantinovna, music teacher —  The Fruits of Enlightenment 
 Brownie —  While She was Dying 
 Young girl —  Flight Attempt 
 Darkie —  The Adventures of Shipov, or Old Vaudeville 
 Avdotya / Marya Antonovna —   The Government Inspector 
 Liza / Varvara —  Russian Jam 
 Lender — Krechinsky's Wedding
 Lisa — Cyrano de Bergerac
 Anna, the Queen's Maid of Honor — The Queen's Private Lives
 Strawberry —  Cipollino is Looking for Treasure 
 Hockey stick —  Exhibits 
 Maid of Honor —  The Crystal Slipper 
 Juliet now — Romeo and Juliet
 Godl —  Memorial Prayer 
 Gitel Mosca — Two for the Seesaw
 Resident of Avlabar — Khanuma
 Lyubov Ivanovna Otradina — Guilty Without Guilt
 Beatrice — The Venetian Twins
 Louise, the maid in his house —  Eight Loving Women 
 Mademoiselle de Chemreau — D'Artagnan and the Three Musketeers
 Bird —  House of the Rising Sun 
 Dunyashka —  The Marriage 
 Divchina —  After two Hares 
 Boyarynya —  Ivan Vasilievich: Back to the Future 
 Damma — The Boat 
 Girl # 2 —  Desperate Dreamers 
  Trio 'Galatea'  — Pygmalion
 Broadway Actress —  The Divas, Or The Show Goes On 
 Evil Queen — Pushkin's Tales
 Princess, White Rose, Rogue — The Snow Queen
 Julia Melville — The Rivals
 Galchonok —  Miracles in Prostokvashino 
 Visitors of the Salon —  Show for Real Ladies 
 Marie — The Nutcracker, or the Secret of the Nut Krakatuk 
 Maid —  No. 13

Kaluga Regional Philharmonic Society 
 Anna Timiryova — The Last Love of Admiral Kolchak
 Marina Tsvetaeva —  Soul That Knows No Measure

Filmography 
 Voroshilov Sharpshooter (1998) as episode (uncredited)
 Attention, says Moscow (2005) as episode (TV series)
 Sheriff (2010) as Secretary (TV series)
 Maryina Roshcha 2 (2014) as Delyagina's secretary (TV series)
 Sonata for Vera (2015) as Elena Makova, pianist (TV series)
 Ugly Girlfriend. Snow White's Mystery (2020) as Ruzhevskaya (TV series)

References

Literature 
 Famous Residents of Kaluga [encyclopedia] / Yu. Zelnikov.  — Kaluga: Golden Alley (2013) page 271:  
 Theatrical Life (2005) page 57

External links
 Profile on  Kaluga Regional Drama Theatre's site
  Anna Sorokina on KinoPoisk 
 Страстной бульвар, 10. Ежемесячный журнал о российском театре
 Калужский областной драматический театр представляет спектакль «Отчаянные мечтатели» по произведению Константина Циолковского
 Спектакль «Последняя любовь адмирала Колчака» представили морякам-черноморцам артисты из Калуги 

1981 births
Living people
People from Kaluga
Russian film actresses
Russian television actresses
Russian stage actresses
21st-century Russian actresses